The Jordanian passport (Arabic: جواز السفر الأردني) is issued by the Civil Status and Passport Department (CSPD) to citizens of Jordan for international travel.

Passport types 
Jordan issues two types of passports:
 Regular passport with a national number: issued to Jordanian citizens with full Jordanian nationality privileges. 
 Regular passport without a national number: Issued to stateless Palestinians who live in Jordan, East Jerusalem, West Bank and Gaza Strip for international travel, starts with letter T for "Temporary". It is also given to Israeli Muslims as Israeli citizens are forbidden from entering Saudi Arabia, although that is changing.
 Diplomatic passport: issued to the government officers who hold the Special Rank, House of Representatives, and Senate. It's distinguished by its red cover.

Physical Appearance 

Jordan's passport is grey. The front side of the passport shows Jordan's coat of arms, with the name of the country above it and the inscription "PASSPORT" below it, as you can see on the image on the right. The passport contains the holder's name, photograph, signature, and date of birth, and other factors that help identify him or her.

Identity page 

 Photo of passport holder (35x45 mm; Head height: 33mm; Distance from the top of the photo to the top of the hair: 4mm)
 Type ("P" for passport)
 Country code
 Passport serial number
 Passport holder's first and last name
 Nationality
 Date of birth (DD MM YYYY)
 Gender (M for male or F for female)
 Place of birth
 Date of Issue (DD MM YYYY)
 Passport Holder's signature
 Validity date (ID.M.YYYY)

Passport written in Arabic and English.

Visa requirements

Visa requirements for Jordanian citizens are administrative entry restrictions by the authorities of Jordan. As of 1 January 2021, Jordanian citizens has visa-free or visa-on-arrival access to 52 countries and territories, ranking the Jordanian passport eighth in the Arabic world in terms of travel freedom (tied with the Turkmen passport) according to the Henley Passport Index.

See also

 Visa requirements for Jordanian citizens

References

External links
 Civil Status and passports Department website

Jordan
Ministry of Interior (Jordan)